Miriam de Souza Pires (20 April 1927 – 7 September 2004) was a Brazilian actress. She acted in over 40 telenovelas, including prominent roles in Irmãos Coragem, Pecado Capital, Gabriela, Pedra sobre Pedra, Sonho Meu, and O Casarão. Having won the Festival de Brasília Best Supporting Actress Award in 1978 for A Summer Rain, Pires acted in twelve films during her career. She was born in Rio de Janeiro, where she died from toxoplasmosis.

Selected filmography

Films
 A Summer Rain (1978)
 Gabriela, Cravo e Canela (1983)
 Kiss of the Spider Woman (1985)
 Subway to the Stars (1987)

Telenovelas
 A Sucessora (1978)
 Tieta (1989)
 Pedra sobre Pedra (1992)
 Sonho Meu (1993)
 Xica da Silva (1996)
 Uga-Uga (2000)
 Um Anjo Caiu do Céu (2001)
 Desejos de Mulher (2002)
 Senhora do Destino (2004)

References

External links

1926 births
2004 deaths
Brazilian film actresses
Brazilian television actresses
Actresses from Rio de Janeiro (city)